Kelli Presley is a fictional character in the 2006 slasher film Black Christmas. The character, created by writer-director Glen Morgan and portrayed by actress Katie Cassidy, serves as a replacement to Jess from the original film.

In the film, Kelli is depicted as a member of the Delta Alpha Kappa sorority. Due to being an only child and not having a large family, she decides to spend Christmas with her sorority sisters. Their sorority house was once the childhood home of notorious murderer Billy Lenz. During Christmas, Kelli and her sisters begin getting obscene phone calls. Realizing that Billy has returned home, the girls attempt to survive the night as, due to a snowstorm, help is unable to reach them.

Critical reception towards the character was polarizing. Some considered her to be likable and sympathetic, whereas others criticized her for being bland, generic and unoriginal as well as being inferior in comparison to Jess from the original Black Christmas. Despite these criticisms, Cassidy herself was generally praised for her performance.

Appearances
In Black Christmas, Kelli first appears with her boyfriend Kyle, telling him that she intends on spending Christmas with her sorority sisters. After arriving back at the Delta Alpha Kappa sorority house, Kelli and her sisters are called by someone using Clair and Megan's phones. Worried about Megan, Kelli goes to her room only to find Kyle there. While attempting to find clues about her disappearance the power goes out, causing Megan's computer to switch on from standby mode and revealing a recording Kyle made of himself having sex with Megan. After kicking him out, she meets Clair's elder half-sister Leigh.

Following Dana's murder, the killer uses her cellphone to call the girls. Suspecting that something is wrong, they go outside to look for her, only to discover Eve killed in her car. Kelli calls 9-1-1, but is told that due to the snowstorm, help would be unavailable for at least two hours. When their housemother Mrs. Mac and Heather decide to take the car and reach the police station themselves, Kelli, Leigh and Melissa all go to Lauren's room to watch through the window and make sure they leave safely. Noticing that they're not leaving, Kelli and Leigh go to check on them through the basement where Leigh slips on Mrs. Mac's blood, who had been killed by a falling icicle. During their absence, Melissa and Lauren are killed by the assailant. Going back to Lauren's room, Kyle has returned and, after a quick confrontation between him and Leigh, they decide to go to the attic in case any of the girls are still alive.

While opening up the attic door, Kyle is attacked and killed. The killer is revealed to be Billy Lenz's sister Agnes, who has set up the corpses of the sorority sisters around a Christmas tree. After Leigh falls through the attic floor, the Christmas tree catches fire while Kelli and Agnes fall into one of the holes in the wall. Managing to escape with Leigh's help, they set the house on fire and reach the hospital. At the hospital, Agnes, who had survived the fire, kills Leigh but Kelli manages to retaliate by using a defibrillator, electrocuting her. When Billy chases her to the stairs, Kelli knocks him over a stair bannister, impaling him on the finial of a Christmas tree and finally killing him. She is last seen staring at Billy's corpse.

Alternate endings
Black Christmas has three alternate endings, the second of which was used as the actual ending for the UK theatrical release of the film. In the UK ending, Billy dies on the operating table from his wounds, thus when Kelli kills Agnes, the scene ends there with her parents picking her up from the hospital. The third ending is similar, having Billy die and Kelli's parents picking her up, but his body disappears and the last shot shows someone moving through the vents, indicating that either Agnes or Billy are still alive. The first ending, which follows the original script, ends with both Kelli and Leigh surviving and Kelli getting a call from someone using Kyle's cellphone.

Casting and creation
Cassidy, who was cast in early 2006, revealed in an interview for When a Stranger Calls (2006) that one of the reasons she became interested in the role of Kelli was because she wanted to play a leading role in a movie and loved the script. In the same interview she also described Kelli as "the girl next door" and stated that "she's probably there on a scholarship or something". In an interview with IGN, Cassidy further revealed that what attracted her to the role of Kelli is that the character "[grows] up" during the course of the film and has an active role, instead of being a damsel in distress.

Reception
Kelli received mostly mixed reviews from critics, with the perception being that she fails to stand out much from the rest of the characters in the film, with Variety describing the character as generic. Horror website Dread Central, when comparing the two films, described Kelli as "an awful character [who] exists in stark contrast to the very likable and level-headed Jess of the original". Despite this, Screen Rant, in their list of the best final girls, when talking about Jess from the original film, praised Kelli for being able to defeat both antagonists by herself.

Katie Cassidy's performance however received a more positive response from critics.

Bloody Disgusting praised Cassidy, along with her co-stars, for bringing a spin to the "sorority girl" persona. Similarly, while The Film File stated that despite of the sorority girls "few of them [are] likable or developed enough for the viewer to care about their fates", with Kelli having few personality traits, Cassidy does show a promising spark.

See also
 Final girl

References

Black Christmas (film series)
Christmas characters
Fictional American people
Fictional college students
Fictional murderers
Film characters introduced in 2006
Final girls